Verkh-Potka is a rural locality (a village) in Toykinskoye Rural Settlement, Bolshesosnovsky District, Perm Krai, Russia. The population was 232 as of 2010. There are 8 streets.

Geography 
Verkh-Potka is located 34 km southwest of Bolshaya Sosnova (the district's administrative centre) by road. Toykino is the nearest rural locality.

References 

Rural localities in Bolshesosnovsky District